Zhang Xianghua (Chinese: 张香花, born 10 May 1968) is a female Chinese rower. She competed at 1988 Seoul Olympic Games. Together with her teammates, she won a silver medal in women's coxed four, and a bronze medal in women's coxed eight.

References

Chinese female rowers
Rowers at the 1988 Summer Olympics
Olympic rowers of China
Olympic silver medalists for China
Olympic bronze medalists for China
Living people
Olympic medalists in rowing
Year of birth missing (living people)
Medalists at the 1988 Summer Olympics
20th-century Chinese women
21st-century Chinese women